The Weyl Service Station, at 124 E. D St. in Trenton, Nebraska, was built in 1921.  It was listed on the National Register of Historic Places in 2002.

It was then owned by the Hitchcock County Historical Society and was operated as a museum.

References

Gas stations on the National Register of Historic Places in Nebraska
National Register of Historic Places in Hitchcock County, Nebraska
Buildings and structures completed in 1921
Museums in Hitchcock County, Nebraska